Driscoll's is a California-based seller of fresh strawberries and other berries. It is a fourth-generation family business that has been in the Reiter and Driscoll families since the late 1800s. In 2017, it controlled roughly one-third of the $6 billion U.S. berry market. Headquartered in Watsonville, California, Driscoll's develops proprietary breeds of berries and then licenses them exclusively through approved growers.

History

Early 1900s, foundation and the Banner Strawberry

The origin of Driscoll's dates back to the late 1800s. In 1849, a butcher from Alsace settled in California and eventually farmed near Watsonville. The butcher's son, J.E. "Ed" Reiter and Reiter's brother-in-law, R. F. "Dick" Driscoll, began growing strawberries in the region. It was the beginning of what has been referred to as "the California strawberry gold rush."

During a meeting between Thomas Loftus, Driscoll, and Reiter, the three formed a partnership to protect and promote strawberries in the Sweetbriar community in northern Shasta County, California. In 1902, the partners began promoting the strawberries in San Francisco markets by wrapping every crate in paper ribbon. The marketing strategy earned the strawberry variety the name "Banner" due to the large strawberry printed on the banner of each crate.

Driscoll's was officially founded in 1904, known at the time as Banner Berry Farm's Brand. They secretly kept Loftus as their supplier and also planted the Banner variety of berries exclusively. The company was the sole supplier of the Banner variety until Reiter formed an outside partnership in 1916 to market the Banner Berry plant. After twenty-years in business, the Banner variety was infected by the spread of a viral infection and Driscoll's began breeding and releasing new varieties of berries. The new varieties were developed by Harold Thomas and Earl Goldsmith from the University of California, Berkeley.

1940s and founding of Driscoll Strawberry Associates

In the early twentieth century, the strawberry market in the United States was dominated by Japanese immigrants. In 1942 during World War II, the industry nearly collapsed due to the Japanese being forced into internment camps. During the war, Driscoll's was one of the few companies still planting strawberries. Following World War II, Driscoll's recruited Japanese-American former prisoners upon their release from the internment camps to become sharecroppers for the company. The company also began marketing under the name Driscoll Strawberry Associates.

In 1944, Goldsmith and Thomas quit their university jobs and went to work for the newly formed Strawberry Institute of California after the university planned to abandon its breeding program. The company purchased seedlings and germplasm from the university that represented the life work of Goldsmith and Thomas. The Strawberry Institute of California would later merge with Driscoll Strawberry Associates.

In 1946, Goldsmith and Thomas crossed two university varieties which eventually became known as Z5A. The variety was known to withstand shipping and also fruited into late summer. The late harvest allowed Driscoll's to ship strawberries to retailers when other growers had none. The berry was developed over a 10-year period and not released until 1957.

1980s to present

Driscoll's sold mainly strawberries until the late 1980s. At that time it was approached with purchase offers from Dole, Del Monte, and Chiquita. The company did not sell and instead decided to expand into other markets, including raspberries, blueberries and blackberries. In the 1990s, Driscoll's created the clamshell, a one-piece container consisting of two halves joined by a hinge area which allows the structure to come together to close.

In 2008 Driscoll's was one of the first two California growers to legally ship strawberries to the People's Republic of China under a program negotiated by then governor Arnold Schwarzenegger. In 2008 the company was also named "business of the year" by the Pajaro Valley Chamber of Commerce and Agriculture. As of 2014, Driscoll's supports the Indigenous Interpreting+ program at Natividad Medical Center, Salinas, California, which provides medical interpreters for speakers of indigenous languages such as Zapotec, Mixteco, and Triqui. In 2015, Driscoll's announced its involvement in "Connect the Drops," a campaign for changes to California water policy.

In 2015, workers and union leaders at two independent growers for Driscoll's called for boycotts against the company. The same year, Driscoll's announced the adoption of global Worker Welfare standards for their independent growers and public commitment to farmworker improvements with third-party audits and assessments. It also announced a pilot program with Fair Trade USA to bring to market Fair Trade Certified organic strawberries and organic raspberries. COO Kevin Murphy was promoted to CEO in 2015, replacing Miles Reiter, who retained his position as chairman of the board. 

By 2016, Driscoll's began testing to develop a robot that would pick strawberries and also went through an international rebranding. The company also announced a name change from Driscoll's Strawberry Associates to Driscoll's, Inc.

In June 2022, Driscoll's acquired Berry Gardens Limited, a sales, packaging and distribution entity of Berry Gardens Grower Cooperative. In July 2022, Driscoll's formally agreed to acquire Haygrove Africa Trading, a Sub-Saharan blueberry supplier.

Products
Driscoll's grows berries in 21 countries and sells them in 48. It contracts with various growers to produce strawberries, blackberries, blueberries, and raspberries, both red and yellow. The berries, available in either organic or non-organic varieties, are packed in the field as they are harvested. The company has fields in California, Florida, Mexico, and Australia. The company's organic berries are certified organic by the USDA. Driscoll's claims to follow good agricultural practices for food safety, which are enforced at all contracting growers' farms, cooling and distribution facilities such as their Santa Maria, California, distribution facility. They also have a distribution facility in Dover, Florida.

The company has a staff of 30 scientists "devoted solely to strawberries, manipulating evolution at nine research stations in Watsonville, Southern California, Florida, Spain, Mexico, and the U.K."

References

External links

Agriculture companies of the United States
Companies based in Santa Cruz County, California
Food manufacturers of the United States
Watsonville, California
Strawberries
Food and drink companies established in 1904
1904 establishments in California
Agriculture in California